Wang Chang (died July or August 259), courtesy name Wenshu, was a Chinese military general and politician of the state of Cao Wei during the Three Kingdoms period of China.

Early life
Wang Chang was from the same commandery as Wang Ling, and both of them were already quite well known when they were still young. Wang Chang became a tutor to Cao Pi when the latter was still a prince. After Cao Pi became the emperor of Wei, Wang Chang was appointed as a Gentleman of Scattered Cavalry, Agriculture Officer of Luoyang, and Inspector of Yan Province. After Cao Pi died in 226, his successor Cao Rui promoted Wang Chang to General Who Spreads Vehemence and granted the title of a Secondary Marquis. When Wang Chang was serving in Yan Province, he was still concerned about affairs in the imperial court. He felt that the system of governance in Wei, inherited from the Qin and Han dynasties, was too strict and flawed. He decided to draft a new constitution for the state, and submitted two memorials, Discussion on Governance and Military Book, to the Wei imperial court.

Battles against Eastern Wu
In 236, Grand Commandant Sima Yi recommended Wang Chang to the second Wei emperor Cao Rui as a talent. Wang Chang was appointed as the Inspector of Xu Province and enfeoffed as the Marquis of Wuguan Village. He was later appointed General Who Attacks the South and acting supervisor of military affairs in Jing and Yu provinces.

Wang Chang noticed that his base at Wancheng was too far away from Xiangyang, an important city on Wei's southern border. Besides, the military camps in that region were quite scattered and their naval force was far away at Xuanchi. If enemy forces from Wei's rival state Eastern Wu attacked them, their armies would not be able to provide support in time. Hence, Wang Chang changed his base to Xinye, ordered drills to be conducted for their naval forces, and promoted agriculture to build up food supplies.

In 250, the political turmoil in Wu had just ended and the Wu general Zhu Ju was recently dismissed by Sun Quan and forced to commit suicide. Wang Chang felt that the time was ripe to attack Wu, so he ordered Zhou Tai to attack Wu, Shigui and Fangling counties; Wang Ji to attack Yiling; while he personally led an attack on Jiangling. Wang Chang's troops used bamboo splints to build bridges to cross the Yangtze River and defeated the Wu general Shi Ji, killing Zhongli Mao and Xu Min, returning victorious to Wei with many spoils of war. For his contributions, Wang Chang was promoted to Senior General Who Attacks the South and promoted from a village marquis to a county marquis under the title "Marquis of Jingling".

In 252, Wang Chang proposed his plan to attack Wu again. At the same time, Zhuge Dan, Hu Zun and Guanqiu Jian also proposed their respective plans. The Wei regent Sima Shi accepted their proposals and ordered them to attack Wu from three directions. Wang Chang was assigned to attack Nan Commandery, but due to Hu Zun and Zhuge Dan's defeat by the Wu general Zhuge Ke, Wang Chang was forced to retreat.

Suppressing rebellions
In 255, the Wei generals Guanqiu Jian and Wen Qin started a rebellion in Shouchun. Wang Chang was promoted to General of Agile Cavalry and tasked with sending troops to help suppress the rebellion. In 257, another Wei general, Zhuge Dan started a rebellion in Shouchun, this time with support from Wu forces. Wang Chang led his army to put pressure on Wu forces at Jiangling, led by Shi Ji and Quan Xi, and prevent them from coming to Zhuge Dan's aid. In 258, after Zhuge Dan's rebellion was crushed, Wang Chang was promoted to Minister of Works and rewarded with an additional 1,000 taxable households in his marquisate. He died in the following year and was granted the posthumous title "Marquis Mu".

Family
Father: Wang Ze, served as Administrator of Dai Commandery in the Eastern Han dynasty
Sons:
Wang Hun, served as a general in Wei and later as Minister over the Masses under the Jin dynasty, participated in the conquest of Wu by Jin in 280
Wang Shen, served as Inspector of Ji Province
Wang Lun, served as an adviser to the General-in-Chief
Wang Zhan, served as Administrator of Runan Commandery
Grandsons:
Wang Shang, Wang Hun's eldest son, held a marquis title, died at a young age
Wang Ji, Wang Hun's second son, served as a Palace Attendant during the Jin dynasty
Wang Cheng, Wang Hun's third son, held a marquis title, served as an official during the Jin dynasty
Wang Wen, Wang Hun's fourth son, served as an official during the Jin dynasty
Wang Cheng, Wang Zhan's son, served as an Inner Attendant in Donghai Commandery
Great-grandsons:
Wang Zhuo, Wang Ji's eldest son, served as an official
Wang Yu, Wang Ji's second son, married a Jin dynasty princess, held the title of Marquis of Minyang
Wang Shu, Wang Cheng's son, served as a Master of Writing and General of the Guards during the Jin dynasty
Great-great-grandson:
Wang Tanzhi, Wang Shu's son, served as a General of the Household and the Inspector of Xu and Yan provinces during the Jin dynasty

See also
 Lists of people of the Three Kingdoms

Notes

References

 Chen, Shou (3rd century). Records of the Three Kingdoms (Sanguozhi).
 Pei, Songzhi (5th century). Annotations to Records of the Three Kingdoms (Sanguozhi zhu).
 Sima, Guang (1084). Zizhi Tongjian.

Year of birth unknown
259 deaths
Cao Wei generals
Cao Wei politicians
Generals from Shanxi
Political office-holders in Jiangsu
Politicians from Taiyuan